Dublin Townships was a parliamentary constituency represented in Dáil Éireann, the lower house of the Irish parliament or Oireachtas from 1937 to 1948. The constituency elected 3 deputies (Teachtaí Dála, commonly known as TDs) to the Dáil, using proportional representation by means of the single transferable vote (PR-STV).

History and boundaries 

The constituency was created under the Electoral (Revision of Constituencies) Act 1935, and first used at the 1937 general election. It was created from the constituency of Dublin County, which was reduced in size. It reflected a transfer of territory from Dublin County to Dublin City effected by the Local Government (Dublin) Act 1930.

The boundaries were defined as: "The area referred to in the Local Government (Dublin) Act 1930, as the added urban districts and also so much of the land described in Part III of the First Schedule to the said Act as is contiguous to the said area and also the townland of Clonskeagh." The "added urban districts" are defined in the 1930 Act as "the urban district of Pembroke and the urban district of Rathmines and Rathgar". Pembroke included Ballsbridge, Donnybrook, Sandymount, Irishtown and Ringsend.

At the next revision of constituencies, under the Electoral (Amendment) Act 1947, it was succeeded by Dublin South-East, which took effect at the 1948 general election.

TDs

Elections

1944 general election 
The surpluses of MacEntee and Costello were distributed on successive counts, but separate figures for the 2nd Count are unavailable.

1943 general election 
Full figures for the second and third counts are unavailable.

1938 general election

1937 general election

See also
Politics of the Republic of Ireland
Elections in the Republic of Ireland

References

External links
Oireachtas Members Database
Dublin Townships layer on OpenStreetMap
Dublin Historic Maps: Parliamentary & Dail Constituencies 1780-1969 (a work in progress)
Dublin Historic Maps: Dublin City historical limits, Between 1840 and 1953
Dublin Historic Maps: Dublin Townships and Urban Districts, between 1847 and 1930

Dáil constituencies in County Dublin (historic)
1937 establishments in Ireland
1948 disestablishments in Ireland
Constituencies established in 1937
Constituencies disestablished in 1948